The Federated Storemen and Packers Union of Australia was an Australian trade union which existed between 1912 and 1988. It represented workers employed in warehousing, transport logistics, and a limited range of manufacturing industries in Australia.

History 
The Storemen and Packers Union was formed in 1912. The union expanded rapidly after its creation, and became a prominent and influential member of the right wing faction of the Australian labour movement. During the 1970s and 80s the Storemen and Packers was heavily involved in the establishment of the superannuation system through a direct action campaign. In 1988 the union amalgamated with the Federated Rubber and Allied Workers Union of Australia to form the National Union of Storeworkers, Packers, Rubber and Allied Workers. Several other small manufacturing and distribution unions soon joined the new body, and in 1991 it was renamed the National Union of Workers.

Leadership 
Percy Clarey (General President, 1918–1960)
Bill Landeryou
Simon Crean

References

External links 
 nuw.org.au The website of the National Union of Workers, the successor to the Storemen and Packers Union.

Defunct trade unions of Australia
Trade unions established in 1912
Trade unions disestablished in 1988
1912 establishments in Australia